Reginald Lorne Scott, C.M. (2009) (b. May 19, 1947) is a Canadian environmentalist and former political figure in Saskatchewan, Canada. From 1991 to 1995 he represented the seat of Indian Head-Wolseley and from 1995 to 1999 he represented Indian Head-Milestone in the Legislative Assembly of Saskatchewan as a New Democratic Party (NDP) member.

Biography 

Lorne Scott was born in Indian Head, Saskatchewan, the son of Reginald and Gertie Scott. Scott worked for the Saskatchewan Museum of Natural History from 1967 to 1975 and for the Wascana Centre Authority, where he worked as a park naturalist from 1975 to 1991. He also operates a farm in the Indian Head area. Scott served as president of the Saskatchewan Wildlife Federation, the Saskatchewan Natural History Society and the Whooping Crane Conservation Association. He was a member of the provincial cabinet, serving as Minister of Saskatchewan Environment and Resource Management from November 22, 1995 until 1999. Scott was defeated by Don McMorris when he ran for reelection to the Saskatchewan assembly in 1999.

In 1999, he was named executive director of the Saskatchewan Wildlife Federation. He also served as Saskatchewan chair for the Nature Conservancy of Canada. In 2008, he was named to the Order of Canada.

References 

Saskatchewan New Democratic Party MLAs
1947 births
Living people
Canadian environmentalists